Ren Pengnian (1894–1968) was a director who created the first standard-length narrative film in China. He started a film company in 1926 called Dongfang Film Studio.

Ren filmed over forty films during his career as a director. He also starred in some of the films he directed. Ren Pengnian's film, Yan Ruisheng was the first narrative film in China to be of full-length. The movie was based on a real murder that occurred in Shangai.

References

External links 
Ren Pengnian. IMDB.

Chinese film directors

1894 births

1968 deaths

Wikipedia Student Program